Ben Folds Five is the debut studio album by American alternative rock band Ben Folds Five, released on August 8, 1995. A non-traditional rock album, it featured an innovative indie-pop sound, and excluded lead guitars completely. The album was released on the small independent label Passenger Records, owned by Caroline Records, a subsidiary of Virgin/EMI. Ben Folds Five received positive reviews, and spawned five singles. The record failed to chart, but sparked an intense bidding war eventually won by Sony Music. Several live versions of songs originally released on Ben Folds Five reappeared later as b-sides or on compilations.

Reception

Ben Folds Five received positive reviews from NME, Rolling Stone, Pitchfork, and Entertainment Weekly. Michael Gallucci praised the album as "a potent, and extremely fun collection of postmodern rock ditties that comes off as a pleasantly workable combination of Tin Pan Alley showmanship, Todd Rundgren-style power pop, and myriad alt-rock sensibilities." Robert Christgau of The Village Voice selected "Boxing" as a "choice cut".

Track listing

Personnel
Ben Folds – piano, vocals
Darren Jessee – drums, vocals, percussion
Robert Sledge – bass, vocals
Ted Ehrhard – violin, viola on "Boxing"
Chris Eubank – cello on "Boxing"

Production
Producer: Caleb Southern
Mixing: Marc Becker
Photography: Alexandria Searls

Charts

Weekly charts

Certifications

}

References

Ben Folds Five albums
1995 debut albums
Albums produced by Caleb Southern
Passenger Records albums